Unleashed is the tenth studio album by the group Two Steps from Hell, released on 22 September 2017. It consists of 56 tracks (20, when excluding alternative versions and uncompressed mixes) written by composers Thomas J. Bergersen and Nick Phoenix. The album is the longest released to the public by Two Steps from Hell. It features vocal performances by Merethe Soltvedt, C.C. White, Felicia Farerre, Úyanga Bold, Nick Phoenix and Linea Adamson. The cover artwork and the sleeve are designed by Steven R. Gilmore.

Bergersen described his tracks as "generally a little lighter in tone than the previous album".

The album peaked at number 1 on the US Classical Albums chart.

Track listing 
The following lists the tracks as presented on the digital release. 

The album was later released on CD, across three discs, on which the additional tracks are ordered differently – the alternative versions and uncompressed mixes are essentially presented back-to-front compared with the digital version, with the former on disc three and the latter, disc two. These two discs also have their own unique cover artwork, again designed by Steven R. Gilmore. 

Main tracks

Critical reception
The critique at IFMCA-associated reviews website, MundoBSO, was positive, describing it as, "in the usual line of the composers, with a wide variety of themes of enormous orchestral, melodic, vocal and choral intensity, with very powerful and beautiful moments." It was rated seven out of ten stars.

Charts

Weekly charts

Year-end charts

References

External links

2017 albums
Two Steps from Hell albums